The Women's omnium competition at the 2018 UCI Track Cycling World Championships was held on 2 March 2018.

Results

Scratch race
The scratch race was started at 14:16.

Tempo race
The tempo race was started at 16:45.

Elimination race
The elimination race was started at 19:33.

Points race and overall standings
After all events.

References

Women's omnium
UCI Track Cycling World Championships – Women's omnium